Matteo Elias Kenzo Guendouzi Valverde Mendoza Olié (born 14 April 1999) is a French professional footballer who plays as a midfielder for Ligue 1 club Marseille and the France national team.

Club career

Early career
Guendouzi started his career at the academy of Paris Saint-Germain at the age of 6. He left Paris to join Lorient's academy in 2014. After representing the Lorient reserve team, he was promoted to the first team in 2016.

Lorient
Guendouzi made his debut for Lorient on 15 October 2016, in the Ligue 1 match against Nantes in a 1–2 defeat. He played nine times in all competitions, during his debut season of 2016–17 as Lorient were relegated to the second tier at the end of the season.

In the 2017–18 season, Guendouzi featured 21 times for Lorient as they missed out on promotion, finishing seventh in Ligue 2.

Arsenal

On 11 July 2018, during the summer transfer window, it was announced that Guendouzi had joined Premier League club Arsenal for an undisclosed fee, believed to be in the region of £7m plus bonuses. Head coach Unai Emery said: "He is a talented young player and a lot of clubs were interested in him. He has big potential and gained good first-team experience last season with Lorient. He wants to learn and improve and will be an important part of our first-team squad". On 12 August 2018, Guendouzi made his Premier League debut in Arsenal's opening fixture of the season against defending Champions Manchester City where he made 72 touches, the most for his team. They lost the match 0–2. Guendouzi scored the first professional goal of his career on 4 October 2018, rounding off the scoring in Arsenal's 3–0 away win over Qarabağ, a low drive from just inside the penalty area, after an assist from Alexandre Lacazette. On 29 May 2019, Guendouzi came off the bench in the Europa League final against Chelsea, in which Arsenal eventually lost 1-4.

On 20 June 2020, following a post-match altercation with Brighton player Neal Maupay, Guendouzi was excluded from Arsenal training and left out of the club's match-day squads due to a history of issues with his "attitude and general conduct."

Loan to Hertha BSC
On 5 October 2020, Arsenal announced that Guendouzi would be loaned out to Hertha BSC for the duration of the 2020–21 season. On 1 November 2020, Guendouzi made his debut in a 1–1 draw against VfL Wolfsburg in the Bundesliga. On 12 December 2020, he scored his first goal for the club and in the Bundesliga against Borussia Mönchengladbach, the game ended in a 1–1 draw.

Marseille 
On 6 July 2021, it was announced that Guendouzi was loaned out to Ligue 1 club Marseille for the 2021–22 Ligue 1 season. The deal included an option-to-buy depending on certain conditions being met. He enjoyed a good start to his Marseille career, quickly gaining the appreciation of fans through both his play, and his personality in standing up for the team - including during a match against Nice, when he protected team-mate Dimitri Payet from fans who rushed onto the pitch, gaining strangle marks on his neck in the process.

On 1 July 2022, it was confirmed that Marseille had activated the option-to-buy clause for a reported £9 million.

International career
Guendouzi was born in a suburb of Paris, France. He has represented France at levels up to France U20s. With partial Moroccan heritage, Guendouzi was approached by Morocco manager Hervé Renard in 2017 to change allegiances to play for the Morocco national team. However, after Guendouzi's father met Renard in March 2017, Guendouzi decided to remain and pledge allegiance to France.

On 2 September 2019, Guendouzi was called up to the French senior side for the first time to replace the injured Paul Pogba for UEFA Euro 2020 qualifiers against Albania and Andorra. However, he was an unused substitute in both matches. Guendouzi was recalled to the France side on 1 September 2021, to replace the injured Corentin Tolisso for World Cup Qualification matches against Bosnia, Ukraine and Finland. He made his debut on 16 November 2021 in a World Cup qualifier against Finland. On 29 March 2022, he scored his first goal for France in a 5–0 friendly win over South Africa.

Personal life 
Matteo Guendouzi has a Moroccan father and French mother. He has a brother called Milan, who is also a footballer.

Guendouzi is married to Mae and the couple welcomed their first child, a daughter, in May 2021.

Career statistics

Club

International

France score listed first, score column indicates score after each Guendouzi goal

Honours
Arsenal
UEFA Europa League runner-up: 2018–19

France
UEFA Nations League: 2020–21
FIFA World Cup runner-up: 2022

References

External links

1999 births
Living people
People from Poissy
Footballers from Yvelines
French footballers
Association football midfielders
FC Lorient players
Arsenal F.C. players
Hertha BSC players
Olympique de Marseille players
Championnat National 2 players
Ligue 1 players
Ligue 2 players
Premier League players
Bundesliga players
France youth international footballers
France under-21 international footballers
France international footballers
2022 FIFA World Cup players
UEFA Nations League-winning players
French expatriate footballers
Expatriate footballers in England
Expatriate footballers in Germany
French expatriate sportspeople in England
French expatriate sportspeople in Germany
French sportspeople of Moroccan descent